Susan Mary Kiefel  (born 17 January 1954) is the chief justice of Australia, in office since 30 January 2017. She has served on the High Court since 2007, having previously been a judge of the Supreme Court of Queensland and the Federal Court. Kiefel is the first woman to serve as Chief Justice.

Early life and education 
Kiefel was born in Cairns, Queensland, in 1954. She attended Sandgate District State High School, leaving at the age of 15 upon completing year 10. In 1971, she completed secretarial training at Kangaroo Point Technical College on a scholarship. She worked as a secretary for a building society, an architect, and an exploration company before starting work as a receptionist for a group of barristers. During this time, she completed secondary school and began studying law.

In 1973, Kiefel joined a firm of solicitors as a legal clerk. Completing her education at night, she enrolled in the Barristers Admission Board course and passed her course with honours. In 1984, while on sabbatical leave, she completed a Master of Laws (LLM) at the University of Cambridge, where she was awarded the C.J. Hamson Prize in Comparative Law and the Jennings Prize. In 2008, she was elected to an honorary fellowship of Wolfson College, Cambridge. She is a life fellow of the Australian Academy of Law.

Career

Legal and judicial career
Kiefel was admitted to the bar in 1975. She became an honorary secretary of the Queensland Bar Association in 1978 and served on its committee in 1993. She was appointed as the first female Queen's Counsel in Queensland in 1987 and was appointed to the Human Rights and Equal Opportunity Commission in 1989. In May 1993, Kiefel was appointed to the Supreme Court of Queensland. The following year she was appointed by the Keating Government to the Supreme Court of Norfolk Island and was one of the first women to be appointed to the Federal Court of Australia on 17 October 1994, after Justice Deirdre O'Connor.

In October 2001, Kiefel was appointed Deputy President of the Australian Federal Police Disciplinary Tribunal and became its president in April 2004. In 2003, Kiefel was appointed as a part-time commissioner of the Australian Law Reform Commission, and was re-appointed for a further three years in 2006.

In August 2009, Justice Kiefel was granted an honorary doctorate from Griffith University. Justice Kiefel was chosen to recognise her distinguished contributions to the legal profession and for leading the way for women in the industry. On 13 June 2011, she was named a companion of the Order of Australia for eminent service to the law and to the judiciary, to law reform and to legal education in the areas of ethics, justice and governance.

Appointment to the High Court
On 13 August 2007, Attorney-General Philip Ruddock announced Kiefel as the nominee to the High Court of Australia to replace the retiring High Court Justice Ian Callinan. Kiefel had previously been considered a favourite nominee to replace former High Court Justice Mary Gaudron when she retired in 2003, and again in 2005 as replacement for Justice Michael McHugh. Kiefel is the third female High Court Justice and the forty-sixth overall. Her appointment alongside incumbent Justice Susan Crennan marked the first time two women sat concurrently on the High Court bench.

Kiefel's nomination was met with support from the Australian Bar Association amid criticism of the lack of consultation by the Australian government. She was considered a conservative "black-letter" judge. She may remain on the High Court until 2024, when she will reach the constitutionally mandatory retirement age of 70.

Chief Justice of Australia
On 29 November 2016, Prime Minister Malcolm Turnbull and Attorney-General George Brandis announced Kiefel's appointment as Chief Justice of Australia. The appointment took effect from 30 January 2017, following the retirement of Robert French. Kiefel is the first woman to be appointed as Chief Justice. Her seat on the court was filled by James Edelman.

Giving the inaugural Lord Atkin Lecture in November 2017, Kiefel expressed her disapproval of the prevalence of judicial dissent, which she believes should be reserved for only the most important cases. She said law students should devote more attention to "mundane majority opinion", and described judges who frequently dissent as "somewhat self-indulgent". She further observed that "humorous dissent may provide the author with fleeting popularity, but it may harm the image the public has of the court and its judges". An article in May 2018 noted that Kiefel had dissented in only two out of 164 cases before the High Court since 2014, classing her as one of the court's "great assenters" along with Patrick Keane and Virginia Bell. She was one of three dissenters in Love v Commonwealth (2020), which found that Aboriginal Australians are not subject to the aliens power in section 51(xix) of the constitution. She stated that the majority had confused property rights with citizenship rights, and said that "race is irrelevant to the questions of citizenship and membership of the Australian body politic".

In June 2020, Kiefel announced that the High Court had in 2019 commissioned an independent investigation into sexual misconduct allegations against her former colleague Dyson Heydon. The inquiry, led by Vivienne Thom, concluded that Heydon had sexually harassed six female associates. In a statement, Kiefel said that she had apologised to the women on behalf of the court and that it had adopted recommendations from the inquiry.

Personal life 
While at Wolfson College, Kiefel met her future husband, Michael Albrecht, a social anthropologist, when she became a member of the college rowing crew and Albrecht was her coach.

See also 
 List of first women lawyers and judges by nationality

References 

Women chief justices
Australian King's Counsel
Justices of the High Court of Australia
Judges of the Federal Court of Australia
Judges of the Supreme Court of Queensland
Companions of the Order of Australia
Fellows of the Australian Academy of Law
Alumni of Wolfson College, Cambridge
People from Cairns
1954 births
Living people
Chief justices of Australia
Australian women judges
Judges of the Supreme Court of Norfolk Island
20th-century Australian judges
21st-century Australian judges
20th-century women judges
21st-century women judges
20th-century Australian women